Anantha Vruthantham is a 1990 Indian Malayalam film, directed by Anil, starring Sai Kumar and Ranjini in the lead roles.

Cast
 Sai Kumar as Dr. Ananthan
 Ranjini as Laeticia
 Usha as Vijayalakshmi
 Innocent as Padmanabha Iyer
 Sukumari as Merzy
 Jagathy Sreekumar as Radhakrishnan	
 Manoj K. Jayan as Kishore
 Vijay Menon
 Mamukkoya	as Thanoor Thaha
 Meena as Subammal

References

External links

1990 films
1990s Malayalam-language films